Aloe flexilifolia is a species of flowering plant in the family Asphodelaceae. It is native to the Usambara Mountains, in north-east Tanzania.

Description
Aloe flexilifolia is a perennial and a shrub. These stems split off from the base, and have lanceolate leaves clumped at the top of the step. The flowers are trimerous and have pedicels  in length. The flowers themselves are bright or brownish red, sometimes yellow, with a tubular shape.

Use
The sap from the crushed roots and leaves of A. flexilifolia is used by the Shambaa people to help reduce inflammation in the testicles and scrotum.

References

flexilifolia
Flora of Tanzania